The Medina of Salé, or Salé old town (in Arabic: المدينة العتيقة لسلا) is the medina quarter and the oldest walled part in the city of Salé in Morocco. It is classified as a national cultural heritage since October 1914, and is considered as one of the oldest medinas of Morocco.

History
Salé, in the time of the Ifrenids, was very difficult to besiege, which made it very difficult for the Almohads to conquer the city. Under the order of the Almohad Caliph Abd al-Mu'min, they decided to destroy the ramparts. Adopting the same motto as his grandfather, Abu Yusuf Yaqub al-Mansur had the Salé enclosure rebuilt on the north and south-east side in 1196.

However, the area facing the sea remained uncovered, which resulted on the greatest disaster of the history of the city and led the Castilians to raid Salé in 1260. The Marinid sultan Abu Yusuf Yaqub ibn Abd al-Haqq built in 1261, on the site of the Spanish attack, a bastion that he named after the massacre Borj Adoumoue ("bastion of Tears"), in reference to the tears he dropped to mourn the victims.

City walls
The medina is surrounded by a nearly 4.3 km long wall, containing several gates, most of which  have remained and are still of use until today. The oldest parts of the wall date back to the Almoravid dynasty (1054-1164), while the newest ones are from the Alaouite era. Some of the notable gates and bastions of the medina of Salé are:

Gates
 Bab Bouhaja - Demolished in 1969
 Bab Chaafa
 Bab Cordoba
 Bab Dar Sanaa
 Bab Ferd
 Bab Jdid
 Bab Lamrissa - Built between 1270 and 1280, with 9 meters width and 9.6 meters height. It is the biggest city gate in Salé and in Morocco.
 Bab Lekhmis - Also called Bab Fès
 Bab Maalqa
 Bab Sebta - Referring to the city of Ceuta, as it points towards the north.

Bastions
 Borj Bab Sebta - Built in 1738
 Borj Addoumoue (Bastion of tears) - Also called the old Skalla - Built in 1261 to protect the city from invasions coming from the Atlantic Ocean
 Borj Rokni - Also called the new Skalla - Built in 1853
 Borj Mellah

Monuments
The medina of Salé hosts a number of historical buildings and monuments built at different times. These include:
 The Great Mosque of Salé - Third largest mosque in Morocco, built between 1028 and 1029.
 The Marinid Medrasa - Built in 1341
 Maristane of Salé
 Sidi Benacher Mauseleum
 Sidi Abdellah Benhassoun Mauseleum

Pictures

References

External links 

 Images of the Medina Wall in Manar al-Athar digital image resource archive

Salé
Medinas of Morocco
Architecture in Morocco
Berber architecture